Professional abuse is "a pattern of conduct in which a person abuses, violates, or takes advantage of a victim within the context of the abuser's profession." This typically involves a violation of the relevant professional organization's code of ethics. Organizational ethics or standards of behavior require the maintenance of professional boundaries and the treatment of people with respect and dignity.

Professional abuse involves those working in a facility were patients/clients are abused due to their vulnerability relying on professionals for assistance.

They are taken advantage of because of this leaving them treated unethically. This type of abuse isn’t noticed as much as other abuse because of the trust that these patients think they have for the abuser and the manipulation antics used upon them.

These types of situations tend to happen in hospitals, nursing homes, rehabilitation centers, schools and many more health related facilities. It’s not just limited to these facilities however, It could also take place in offices that deal heavily with patients.

Forms of abuse 
There are many forms of abuse:
discriminatory,
financial,
physical,
psychological, and
sexual.

Professional abuse always involves:
betrayal,
exploitation, and
violation of professional boundaries.

Professionals can abuse in three ways:
 nonfeasance - ignore and take no indicated action - neglect.
 misfeasance - take inappropriate action or give intentionally incorrect advice.
 malfeasance - hostile, aggressive action taken to injure the client's interests.

Solutions 
There are several strategies available to organizations seeking to address professional abuse. A study, for instance, revealed that this problem often arises when there is an extreme power imbalance between the professional and the victim. A framework based on different grades of client empowerment and ways of strengthening it can help solve the problem. Those who have been subjected to professional abuse could also pursue any of the following courses of actions: lodging a complaint; reporting abuse to the police; and, taking legal action. There are also organizations that can help those who are victimized learn more about their rights and the options available to them.

See also

Further reading

Books
 Dorpat Theodore L. Gaslighting, the Double Whammy, Interrogation and Other Methods of Covert Control in Psychotherapy and Analysis (1996) 
 Penfold, P. Susan Sexual Abuse by Health Professionals: A Personal Search for Meaning and Healing (1998) 
 Peterson Marilyn R. At Personal Risk: Boundary Violations in Professional-Client Relationships (1992) 
 Richardson, Sarah and Melanie Cunningham Broken Boundaries - stories of betrayal in relationships of care (2008) 
 Sheehan Michael J. Eliminating professional abuse by managers - Chapter 12 of Bullying: from backyard to boardroom (1996)

Academic papers

References

Abuse
Professional ethics
Institutional abuse